Gilbert Legrand (died 1977) was a French football manager. He managed Jeunesse Esch and the Luxembourg national football team.

References

 
Year of birth missing
1977 deaths
Luxembourg national football team managers
French football managers
French expatriate football managers
Expatriate football managers in Luxembourg
Jeunesse Esch managers